Courtney Raetzman (born April 9, 1994) is an American soccer midfielder player who previously played  for Chicago Red Stars in the NWSL.

Career
After four years playing at the University of Kentucky, Raetzman was drafted by Chicago Red Stars with the 32nd overall pick in the 2016 NWSL College Draft. She was named to the Red Stars 2016 Opening Day Roster and appeared in 6 games. She was waived by the team ahead of the 2017 season.

References

External links
Kentucky bio

1994 births
Living people
American women's soccer players
Kentucky Wildcats women's soccer players
Chicago Red Stars players
National Women's Soccer League players
Chicago Red Stars draft picks
Women's association football midfielders
American expatriate sportspeople in Canada
Expatriate women's soccer players in Canada
Ottawa Fury (women) players
USL W-League (1995–2015) players